Operation Counterspy is a 1965 Italian-Spanish-French Eurospy film written and directed by Nick Nostro and starring George Ardisson.  It was shot in Istanbul. A sequel film was initially planned, but the plans were abandoned  due to schedule conflicts of the main actor George Ardisson.

Plot

Cast 

 George Ardisson as Lord George Moriston 
 Hélène Chanel as   Pat
  Lena von Martens  as Alina
  Joaquín Díaz as Oakes
  Corinne Fontaine  as Claudie
 Umberto Raho as Von Bliss 
  Emilio Messina  as Franco
  Ricardo Rodríguez  as Gussiè
  Tom Felleghy	
 Thea Fleming

References

External links

1965 films
1960s spy thriller films
1960s Italian-language films
Italian spy thriller films
Spanish spy thriller films
French spy thriller films
Films directed by Nick Nostro
Films with screenplays by Nick Nostro
Films scored by Franco Pisano
1960s French films
1960s Italian films